Coimadai is a locality in central Victoria, Australia. The town name comes from an Aboriginal word meaning "Resting Male Kangaroo".

References

External links

Towns in Victoria (Australia)